John V. Coleman (1874 - ?) was a coal miner and state legislator in West Virginia. He served in the West Virginia House of Delegates in 1920. He was one of four African Americans who were elected to represent Fayette County, West Virginia in the House of Delegates from 1896 to 1918.

References

1874 births
Members of the West Virginia House of Delegates
African-American state legislators in West Virginia
Year of death missing